Danilo Boza Júnior (born 6 May 1998), known as Danilo Boza, is a Brazilian footballer who plays as either a central defender or a right back for Juventude.

Club career

Early career
Born in Rondonópolis, Mato Grosso, Boza began his career with hometown side Rondonópolis before moving to the São Paulo state. After spending one year at Monte Azul, he had failed trials at Red Bull Brasil and Atlético Mineiro before playing for Grêmio Prudente's under-17 team in 2015.

Mirassol
Still in 2015, Boza moved to Palmeiras, but featured rarely and joined Mirassol in 2016, being initially assigned to the under-20s. He made his first team debut on 12 July 2016, starting in a 0–0 home draw against Votuporanguense, for the year's Copa Paulista.

Boza was definitely promoted to the main squad for the 2017 Copa Paulista, and scored his first senior goal on 15 July 2017, netting the equalizer in a 1–2 loss at Penapolense. On 6 July of the following year, after being a regular starter in the 2018 Campeonato Paulista, he was loaned to Portuguese side S.C. Braga.

Assigned to Braga's B-team in LigaPro, Boza featured rarely and subsequently returned to Brazil and joined Athletico Paranaense in July 2019. On 11 September, he moved to Figueirense on loan, but only featured for the under-21 team in the Copa Santa Catarina.

Back to Athletico for the 2020 campaign, Boza was assigned to the under-23 squad for the Campeonato Paranaense. After featuring rarely, he returned to Mirassol in July 2020, and helped the side to achieve promotion to the Série C as a starter.

Santos (loan)
On 2 June 2021, Boza was loaned to Santos until the end of the year, with a buyout clause. He made his debut for the club four days later, replacing Jean Mota late into a 3–1 Série A home win against Ceará.

Juventude
On 1 January 2022, Boza signed a permanent four-year contract with Juventude, also in the top tier.

Career statistics

Honours
Mirassol
 Campeonato Brasileiro Série D: 2020

References

External links

1998 births
Living people
Sportspeople from Mato Grosso
Brazilian footballers
Association football defenders
Campeonato Brasileiro Série A players
Campeonato Brasileiro Série B players
Campeonato Brasileiro Série D players
Liga Portugal 2 players
Mirassol Futebol Clube players
S.C. Braga B players
Figueirense FC players
Club Athletico Paranaense players
Santos FC players
Esporte Clube Juventude players
CR Vasco da Gama players
Brazilian expatriate footballers
Brazilian expatriate sportspeople in Portugal
Expatriate footballers in Portugal